Terry Geoffrey Morrison (16 June 1951 – 24 December 2021) was a New Zealand rugby union player. A wing, Morrison represented Otago at a provincial level, and was a member of the New Zealand national side, the All Blacks, in 1973. He played four matches for the All Blacks including one international. He was the New Zealand 200 m champion in 1976, with a time of 21.95 s. Morrison died from a heart attack on 24 December 2021, at the age of 70.

References

1951 births
2021 deaths
Rugby union players from Hamilton, New Zealand
People educated at Matamata College
New Zealand rugby union players
New Zealand international rugby union players
Otago rugby union players
Rugby union wings
New Zealand male sprinters